Pete Wisdom is a fictional secret agent published by Marvel Comics. He first appeared in Excalibur vol. 1 #86 (February 1995), and was created by Warren Ellis and Ken Lashley. Wisdom is a British Secret Service agent with the mutant ability to throw "blades" of energy ("hot knives") from his fingertips.

Publication history
Pete Wisdom was initially created by Ellis and drawn by Ben Dilworth, in a pitch for Electric Angel for publisher Trident Comics. Wisdom was an angry young Essex man, with the power to summon electricity. Ellis said at Toronto Comicon 2005 that the character is based on Jack Regan from The Sweeney. Later, at Marvel, Wisdom formally debuted, his first appearance was as an agent for the British covert organization Black Air in Excalibur vol. 1, #86 (February 1995).

The pair starred in the Pryde and Wisdom three-issue miniseries, which introduced Wisdom's sister Romany, as well as his father Harold, a retired Scotland Yard inspector. Soon after, Warren Ellis became the 'plotmaster' of X-Force - Ian Edginton was the actual scripter. He next appeared in New Excalibur scripted by Chris Claremont. Originally, the series' mandate was to explore the fallout from House of M in Britain.

In November 2006, Pete Wisdom also starred in a six-issue limited series titled Wisdom under the MAX comics imprint. From May 2008 to July 2009 Wisdom appeared as one of the main characters in the series Captain Britain and MI: 13.

Fictional character biography

Pete Wisdom was born to Scotland Yard detective-sergeant Harold Wisdom. He has a sister, Romany, who is an occultist, a former employee of the police's Department of Unusual Deaths (Dept F.66) and ally of Union Jack. His mother was killed by mass murderer Michael Robert Ryan while waiting for Pete to visit, a visit he had blown off after an argument with her (both he and his father blame him for her death). He went on to join MI6 and later transferred to its fellow intelligence agency Black Air, where he alluded to having been in a relationship with his superior, Michelle Scicluna.

Due to being constantly sent out on wetworks (assassination assignments), he grows to hate his job and asks for a transfer. Scicluna tasks him to act as a non-combat adviser to Excalibur, who Black Air had requested to investigate in Genosha for them, and in return he will be permitted to leave Black Air. He borrows Excalibur transport to reach and help an old friend, being forced to take Kitty Pryde with him; the two of them end up investigating Black Air's "Dream Nails" facility and the horrors within, and Wisdom is almost tortured to death by one of his employer's agents. Following this he is invited to join Excalibur by Kitty and they start a relationship (leading to an ongoing feud between him and Lockheed).

Both Wisdom and Excalibur are able to expose Black Air's links to the Hellfire Club, cripple the organization, and prevent its grand scheme. With Kitty, he teams up his father, his sister, and Department F.66 to track down an occult serial killer. A remnant cell of Black Air hires a contract killer and former girlfriend of Wisdom's to assassinate him.  He manages to escape, but has Nightcrawler briefly captured by the cell; the guilt causes him to become far more anti-social, driving Kitty away. Unwilling to see if the relationship can be salvaged, he leaves Excalibur.

After Excalibur, and now sporting an unnecessary eye patch to look sexy, he organizes a group of former intelligence operatives to strike out at black-ops agencies and individuals, and requests X-Force's aid in recovering a cybernetic brain from Genosha, fighting Magneto in the process. Wisdom is later seen as the new leader of the team.  He acts as a mentor and shows the team members how to use their mutant powers in new ways.  When his sister Romany Wisdom returns as a villain, Pete Wisdom is apparently murdered.  When the remainder of X-Force (with the exception of Domino) are presumed killed, Wisdom is revealed to still be alive.  Wisdom's survival is supposedly not known to any members of X-Force.

After M-Day, Wisdom retains his powers and is later ordered by MI-13 to find and team with Captain Britain.  He joins New Excalibur. Outside of Excalibur, he works in a strike team for MI-13 that deals with "weird happenings", clashing with MI-6, who feel that is their jurisdiction. As a result of his work, he ends up in an arranged marriage with his teammate Tink (a fairy) to cement a treaty between the United Kingdom and Otherworld. He begins a romance with teammate Maureen Raven, an Ulster-born psychic, but is eventually forced to kill her to end the Martian invasion of Britain.

Following the invasion, Wisdom once again teams with Captain Britain and other heroes to stop the Skrull invasion of Earth. He is contacted by Merlin, who directs Wisdom into setting him free to resurrect a (temporarily) deceased Captain Britain; in doing so, Wisdom has to knowingly open a prison for evil magics (as well as entities like Satannish). Now owed a boon by the dark forces, Wisdom is able to have a magical anti-Skrull shield erected around the British Isles, which leaves the nation under constant threat of the supernatural. Wisdom has to cope with the death of his friend, a John Lennon-impersonating Skrull who had worked with him and Spitfire to repel the invasion.

MI-13's first battle is against the Duke of Hell Dr Plokta, who gains power when people willingly sell their souls to live in their heart's desire; Wisdom is tempted with the fantasy of Kitty, Maureen and everyone he had gotten killed still being alive. His teammate Captain Midlands betrays them to Plokta in order to live in a fantasy where his wife had not died; disgusted and angry, Wisdom deliberately destroys his fantasy and has him arrested. Understanding how Midlands feels (due to his own losses), Pete shows him some mercy and gives him the chance to commit suicide.

In the United Kingdom's war against Count Dracula, Wisdom takes a key command role. Despite an initial routing, he devises a successful tactic of using misinformation, a staged defeat, a blackmailed Plokta's dream corridors, and pre-emptive strikes to prevent Dracula and his invasion force from realising the UK still has a magical spell that requires a vampire to be invited into its borders. The bulk of the vampire army is destroyed in an instant: Wisdom says that Dracula thought he was playing chess but you would only do so if you "don't care about the pieces... [otherwise] you cheat".

Powers and abilities
Peter Wisdom has the power to absorb ambient heat and solar radiation, and release the absorbed energy from his fingertips as "hot knives" of pure thermal energy, said to be as "hot as the surface of the sun". He can leap from high distances and use the thermal energy to slow his descent. He can fire his hot knives as projectiles, or leave them attached to his fingertips like claws for close physical combat.  He also has years of experience in espionage from working for Black Air and British Intelligence.

Reception
 In 2014, Entertainment Weekly ranked Pete Wisdom 97th in their "Let's rank every X-Man ever" list.

Other versions

House of M
Pete Wisdom appears as both the personal secretary and bodyguard to Brian Braddock, the King of Great Britain.

Ultimate Marvel
The Ultimate version of Wisdom made his first appearance in Ultimate Human #1, a mini-series written by Ellis and starring Ultimate Iron Man and Ultimate Hulk. This Wisdom is an ex-British Intelligence agent thrown out of the organization after testing his "British Enhancile Project" on himself turning him into the Ultimate version of The Leader. 
The Leader attempts to steal Tony Stark's nanotechnology as Banner and Stark work together to try and incorporate it into Banner's physiology in the hopes that it will grant him control over his transformations into the Hulk. A flashback reveals that Wisdom was an ambitious Director of Operations for the Special Intelligence Service who strongly disapproved of the European Super-Soldier programme (which eventually produced Captain Britain), believing British superhumans should be trained covert agents, rather than based on the American model.
Wisdom persuades the Head of Service to give him four weeks to prove his point before the European programme starts and arranges for Dr. Stragg, the scientist responsible for the Enhancile Project, to use him as a test subject. When he returned to the SIS, the Head of Service judged the project a failure, having turned Wisdom into a "circus freak", and told him to "run and hide". Wisdom now hopes that Banner's DNA and Stark's nanotechnology will increase his abilities and enable him to "save" his country. When Stark commands a decoy Iron-Tech robot into the base of the Leader, Banner transforms into the Hulk. The Hulk resists the Leader's influence, and pounds him into the ground. The Leader, almost dead, commands a C-17 down onto the Hulk, ultimately killing Wisdom/Leader.

The Earth-1610 version of Peter Wisdom has an enlarged brain, an attempt to duplicate the peculiarity of Tony Stark's DNA that causes him to have brain tissue throughout his body. He also has a strengthened skull to support this, due to injections of the Super-Soldier "stack" created by Banner.  However, his neck is apparently unable to support the weight of his enlarged cranium, as Wisdom is shown wearing a halo brace to keep his head upright; he also uses a wheelchair in every appearance after his transformation. His enhanced brain has given him psychic talents, including the ability to kill someone by willing them to stop breathing or by making their heart explode through their chest.

Earth-9586
Named Petros Wisdom, Wisdom is Friar Albion a Captain Britain Corps member who featured in Excalibur vol. 1 #44 (1991).

Age of Apocalypse
While absent during the original event, Pete Wisdom is revealed, following the fall of Apocalypse, as active in England during Logan's rule as Weapon Omega and among the members of the Knights of Pendragon, a group of peacekeepers. The mutants of England were largely self-governing, but still subject to Weapon Omega's dictates and rules. Its also revealed that during Apocalypse regime, Pete worked with Emma Frost, formerly of the Human High Council, to save as many humans as they could from Apocalypse's cullings, but even an ocean away it was a losing struggle. Pete provided some support to Prophet and his X-Terminated when they came to Europe looking for von Doom and the Richards diaries.

Deadpool 2

References

External links
 Pete Wisdom at Marvel.com
 Spotlight on Pete Wisdom at UncannyXmen.net
 
 Pete Wisdom at the International Catalogue of Superheroes
 Pete Wisdom of Earth-1043 at the Appendix to the Handbook of the Marvel Universe

Interviews
SDCC '06: Paul Cornell Takes On Pete Wisdom For Marvel/MAX (cached), Newsarama, July 23, 2006
Speaking With Wisdom (cached), Wizard, October 31, 2006

Comics characters introduced in 1995
Marvel UK
British superheroes
Marvel Comics mutants
Marvel Comics superheroes
Fictional blade and dart throwers
Fictional characters with absorption or parasitic abilities
Fictional characters with fire or heat abilities
Fictional British secret agents
Characters created by Warren Ellis
Excalibur (comics)